Laikipia North (sub-County) is a constituency in Kenya. It is one of three constituencies in Laikipia County.

References 

Constituencies in Laikipia County